A cricket team representing the Yorkshire Cricket Board played 10 List A cricket matches between 1999 and 2003. This is a list of the players who appeared in those matches.

Jeremy Batty, 1 match, 1999 
Andrew Bethel, 10 matches, 1999–2003
Paul Booth, 3 matches, 2000–2001
Christopher Brice, 3 matches, 2001–2003
Dan Broadbent, 1 match, 2002 
Gary Brook, 4 matches, 2000–2001
Anthony Burton, 1 match, 1999 
John Carruthers, 6 matches, 1999–2001
Steven Clark, 2 matches, 2002–2003
Ian Dews, 1 match, 1999 
Matthew Doidge, 6 matches, 1999–2001
Stephen Foster, 6 matches, 1999–2002
Andrew Gale, 3 matches, 2001–2003
Chris Gilbert, 1 match, 2002 
Neil Gill, 6 matches, 2000–2003
Mark Gilliver, 4 matches, 1999–2001
Lee Goddard, 2 matches, 2002–2003
Christopher Gott, 1 match, 1999 
Peter Graham, 1 match, 1999 
Darren Harland, 4 matches, 2001–2003
Martin Kellaway, 2 matches, 2001–2002
Richard Kettleborough, 2 matches, 2000 
Greg Lambert, 1 match, 1999 
Richard McCarthy, 2 matches, 2000 
Anthony McKenna, 5 matches, 1999–2000
Alan Mynett, 2 matches, 1999 
Steven Patterson, 2 matches, 2002–2003
John Proud, 3 matches, 2000–2001
Richard Pyrah, 4 matches, 2001–2003
Gary Ramsden, 1 match, 2002 
Alex Roberts, 1 match, 2002 
John Sadler, 1 match, 1999 
Christopher Siddall, 1 match, 2000 
David Stiff, 1 match, 2001 
Pieter Swanepoel, 4 matches, 2001–2003
Nick Thornicroft, 1 match, 2001 
Andrew Walker, 3 matches, 1999–2000
Lesroy Weekes, 1 match, 1999 
Simon Widdup, 3 matches, 2002–2003
Richard Wilkinson, 4 matches, 2001–2002

References

 
Yorkshire Cricket Board
Cricketers